Belinda Kitching  (born 15 July 1977) is an Australian football coach and former goalkeeper for the Australia women's national soccer team.

Playing career
Kitching played junior football for Coalstars in Ipswich, before progressing to the senior team where she won the Football Brisbane Women's Premier League Player of the Season in 1996. The same year, she was selected for the Queensland Academy of Sport Women's football program, where she played in the fledgling national Women's competition.

In 1996, Kitching was selected for the Australia women's national soccer team. She was part of the team at the 1998 OFC Women's Championship and started two group games at the 1999 FIFA Women's World Cup.

Kitching played 36 times for the Matildas and recorded 9 clean sheets.

Coaching career

Kitching played for Tweed Heads Women from 2001, before taking over the coaching role a year later. After five years, she moved north to Hervey Bay to become player coach at United Warriors, a post she held until 2016.

In October 2016 Kitching returned to her home town of Ipswich to become Senior Women's coach of Western Pride FC, having gained her Football Federation Australia B license the previous year.

Personal life
Kitching is the granddaughter of Socceroo George "Fat" Kitching, while her father George Jnr was also a goalkeeper who represented Queensland.

References

External links
 

1977 births
Living people
Sportspeople from Ipswich, Queensland
Soccer players from Queensland
Australian women's soccer players
Australia women's international soccer players
Place of birth missing (living people)
1999 FIFA Women's World Cup players
Women's association football goalkeepers
Sportswomen from Queensland